La Campana-Peñuelas is a Biosphere Reserve located in west-central Chile. which includes La Campana National Park and the Lago Peñuelas National Reserve. Forests within the La Campana-Peñuelas are habitats for the Chilean Wine Palm, Jubaea chilensis, an endangered palm, which had a much broader distribution prior to modern times.

Gallery

See also
 Cuesta La Dormida
 List of environment topics
 World Network of Biosphere Reserves

References
 C. Michael Hogan. 2008. Chilean Wine Palm: Jubaea chilensis, GlobalTwitcher.com, ed. Nicklas Stromberg
 UNESCO. 2007. La Campana-Peñuelas Biosphere Reserve

Line notes

Biosphere reserves of Chile
Protected areas of Valparaíso Region